The 1954 National League Division One was the 20th season of speedway in the United Kingdom and the ninth post-war season of the highest tier of speedway.

Summary
Bristol dropped out of the league and joined the National League Division Two. Wimbledon won their first National League Championship, beginning a run of 7 titles in 8 years, ending a similar run by Wembley Lions.

Final table

Top Ten Riders (League only)

National Trophy
The 1954 National Trophy was the 17th edition of the Knockout Cup.

Qualifying first round

Qualifying second round

Qualifying Final Round

First round

Quarterfinals

Semifinals

Final

First leg

Second leg

Wembley were National Trophy Champions, winning on aggregate 123–92.

See also
 List of United Kingdom Speedway League Champions
 Knockout Cup (speedway)

References

Speedway National League
1954 in speedway
Speedway National League